Haji Jefridin bin Haji Atan (born 19 January 1968) is a Malaysian politician who has served as Member of the Johor State Legislative Assembly (MLA) for Kukup since March 2022 and Senator since September 2020. He is a member of the United Malays National Organisation (UMNO), a component party of the ruling Barisan Nasional (BN) coalition.

Politics 
He was the former private secretary to the ex-Prime Minister Abdullah Ahmad Badawi since 2001. A member of the United Malays National Organisation (UMNO), the major component of the Barisan Nasional (BN), he is also the incumbent party's Division Head of Tanjung Piai.

During the 2019 Tanjung Piai by-election that was triggered following the death of Mohamed Farid Md Rafik, Jefridin was widely considered as the potential candidate of the BN coalition. This was despite of the stronghold of the former MP Wee Jeck Seng from the Malaysian Chinese Association (MCA), another component of the BN, the majority voters of the constituency are Malays. However, the BN had finally chosen Wee Jeck Seng, who later defeated the then ruling Pakatan Harapan (PH) candidate, Karmaine Sardini.

On 13 September 2020, Jefridin was appointed the Senator by the Johor State Legislative Assembly, after recommended by the Menteri Besar Hasni Mohammad. He was officially inaugurated 2 days later.

On 12 March 2022, he was elected to be the Member of Johor State Legislative Assembly for Kukup.

Election results

References

External links 
 Jefridin Atan on Instagram

Living people
1968 births
United Malays National Organisation politicians